Tebworth is a hamlet located in the Central Bedfordshire district of Bedfordshire, England.

The settlement is close to Wingfield and Hockliffe, with the nearest town being Houghton Regis. Amenities in Tebworth include "The Queens Head" pub.

Tebworth is part of the ward of 'Heath and Reach' which sends a Councillor to Central Bedfordshire Council. The ward includes the villages of Heath and Reach, Hockliffe, Eggington, Stanbridge, Tilsworth, Tebworth, and Wingrave.  The ward was created in 2011 and has since been represented by Councillor Mark Versallion. At the 2011 Census the population of the hamlet was included in the civil parish of Chalgrave.

Notable residents
 Colin Edwynn, actor who appeared in Coronation Street, and Heartbeat, lived in and operated "The Queens Head" pub in Tebworth
 Jack Wild, actor who starred in H.R. Pufnstuf and Oliver!, lived in Tebworth before his death in 2006

External links

Hamlets in Bedfordshire
Central Bedfordshire District